was a Japanese architect.  He graduated from Tokyo Art School (now Tokyo National University of Fine Arts and Music) in 1923.  His style, known as sukiya, combines elements of traditional Japanese architecture and modernist architecture.  Among his notable projects was the fourth iteration of the Kabuki-za, which was torn down in 2010 and replaced in 2013 by a new structure designed by Kengo Kuma. Yoshida was born and died in Tokyo.

References

1894 births
1974 deaths
Japanese architects
People from Tokyo
Recipients of the Order of Culture